Gina del Rosario Selmo (born May 12, 1986, in Santo Domingo) is a  volleyball player from the Dominican Republic, who won the bronze medal with the women's national team at the 2007 Panamerican Cup in Colima, Mexico.  Later that year, she also won the bronze medal at the NORCECA Championship in Winnipeg, Manitoba, Canada.  Gina is the twin sister of Ginnette Del Rosario.

Playing as a setter she also competed at the 2007 FIVB World Grand Prix for her native country, wearing the #8 jersey.

Beach volley
Along with her twin sister, Ginnette, she played at the 2008 and 2009 NORCECA Beach Volleyball Circuit.

Clubs
 Deportivo Nacional (2003)
 Liga Juan Guzman (2005)
 Deportivo Nacional (2007)
 Distrito Nacional (2008)

References

External links
 
 

1986 births
Living people
Dominican Republic beach volleyball players
Dominican Republic women's volleyball players
Volleyball players at the 2007 Pan American Games
Twin sportspeople
Dominican Republic twins
Women's beach volleyball players
Setters (volleyball)
Pan American Games competitors for the Dominican Republic